Product of Society is the debut album by the American thrash metal band Defiance. It was released in 1989 on Roadracer Records. It was the only album by Defiance to feature Ken Elkington on vocals and had cover art by Ed Repka. The first album is much more straightforward tech thrash metal style comparing to their other albums, which would have a more progressive/complex sound until The Prophecy.

Re-released in 2008 by Metal Mind Productions from Poland as a new digipack edition on golden disc, digitally remastered using 24-Bit process and limited to 2000 numerated copies.

Annihilator guitarist Jeff Waters produced the album. However, the band was very unsatisfied with his production, which sounds very thin and takes away from the thrash metal crunch that gives the music its tonal identity.

Track listing
"The Fault" - 3:09
"Death Machine" - 3:54
"Product of Society" - 3:27
"Forgotten" - 3:43  
"Lock Jaw" - 3:40  
"Insomnia" - 3:55  
"Deadly Intentions" - 2:53  
"Aftermath" - 1:27  
"Tribulation" - 5:04  
"Hypothermia" - 5:18

Re-release bonus tracks
"Hypothermia" (demo) – 5:25
"Aftermath" (demo) – 1:39
"Deadly Intentions" (demo) – 3:16
"M.I.A. (Forgotten)" (demo) – 3:58
"Product of Society" (demo) – 3:38
"Riff Raff" (live) – 4:14
"Matt's Drum Solo" (live) – 1:07
"Checkmate into Skits/Illusions" (live) – 8:39

Personnel 
Ken Elkington – lead vocals
Doug Harrington – guitars
Jim Adams – guitars
Mike Kaufmann – bass
Matt Vander Ende – drums

References

1989 debut albums
Defiance (band) albums
Albums with cover art by Ed Repka
Roadrunner Records albums